Taratanr (also spelled Taratand) is a village in the Gandey CD block in Giridih Sadar subdivision of Giridih district in the Indian state of Jharkhand.

Geography

Location

Area overview
Giridih district is a part of the Chota Nagpur plateau, with rocky soil and extensive forests. Most of the rivers in the district flow from the west to east, except in the northern portion where the rivers flow north and north west. The district has coal and mica mines. It is an overwhelmingly rural district with small pockets of urbanisation. 

Note: The map alongside presents some of the notable locations in the district. All places marked in the map are linked in the larger full screen map.

Demographics
According to the 2011 Census of India, Taratanr had a total population of 3,401, of which 1,757 (52%) were males and 1,644 (48%) were females. Population in the age range 0-6 years was 714. The total number of literate persons in Taratanr was 1,527 (56.83% of the population over 6 years).

Civic administration

Police station
Taratanr police station has jurisdiction over the Gandey CD block.

Transport
State Highway 13 (Jharkhand), running from Koderma to Gobindpur, passes through Taratanr. There is a bridge over the Barakar nearby, crossing over to Tundi CD block in Dhanbad district.

References

Villages in Giridih district